Hubert "Hubsi" von Meyerinck (23 August 1896 – 13 May 1971) was a German film actor. He appeared in more than 280 films between 1921 and 1970.

Biography
Meyerinck was born in Potsdam, Brandenburg, the son of Friedrich von Meyerinck (1858–1928), Hauptmann (Captain) in the Prussian Army. He grew up at his family's estates in the Province of Posen and attended the gymnasium secondary school in Godeberg. Having passed his Abitur exams, he was called up for military service as a cadet in World War I, but soon was dismissed due to a pulmonary disease.

In 1917 he gave his debut as a theatre actor at the Schauspielhaus in Berlin and from 1918 to 1920 continued his career at the Hamburg Kammerspiele. Back in Berlin he performed in avant-garde plays by Carl Sternheim, as well as in several revue entertainments and kabarett venues. Later he returned to classical theatre with engagements at the Deutsches Theater and the Lessing Theater, performing as The Imaginary Invalid, Mephistopheles, but also as Captain of Köpenick or as Meckie Messer in Brecht's Threepenny Opera.

From 1920 onwards, Meyerinck starred as a silent film actor, whereby he developed a distinctive appearance with his high forehead and moustache, often emphasizing his hypnotic expression by sporting a monocle. He was able to continue his career in the sound film era by his unmistakable rasping voice, which perfectly added to his physiognomy, having a standing order for scoundrels and charlatan roles.

Commonly identified as a homosexual he ran the risk to be imprisoned by the Nazi authorities like his friend Kurt von Ruffin, nevertheless, he performed in numerous entertainment films of Nazi cinema. After World War II, Meyerinck remained one of the busiest film actors in West German cinema. He starred as quirky official, devious noble or impostor in numerous film comedies, often together with Peter Alexander and young Ilja Richter but also in several Edgar Wallace films of the 1960s. The magazine Der Spiegel called Meyernick's role in numerous films a "comical Erich von Stroheim, who parodied Prussianism and made it ridiculous". He also continued as a theatre actor, from 1966 in the ensemble of the Thalia Theater in Hamburg.

Hubert von Meyernick made one of his few Hollywood film appearances in Billy Wilder's film satire One, Two, Three (1961), portraying in a memorable supporting role the penniless aristocrat Count Waldemar von und zu Droste-Schattenburg, who adopts Horst Buchholz for financial reasons. Meyernicks skills in English were rather limited, so he was dubbed by German-American character actor Sig Ruman. The Jewish Billy Wilder spoke about Meyernick in a 1997 interview with Der Spiegel: "I remember a gay actor, we called him Hubsi, Hubert von Meyernick. He never vaunted himself for that, but during the Kristallnacht he went along the Kurfürstendamm and called: If somebody among you is Jewish, follow me! He cached the people in his apartment. Yes, there were decent people, whose words you could believe, that it was hard to do resistance during that time. People like Meyernick were marvelous, wonderful."

Meyerinck died from heart failure in Hamburg. He is buried in the Schladen cemetery near Braunschweig.

Filmography

 Desire (1921) - Role (uncredited)
 Peter Voss, Thief of Millions (1921, part 1–7) - Gehilfe von Mann mit der Narbe
 The Lost Shoe (1923) - Minor Role
 Manon Lescaut (1926) - The Younger Bli
 People to Each Other (1926) - Feinschmecker
 The Flames Lie (1926) - Ein Liebhaber
 Aftermath (1926) - Heino
 Doña Juana (1928) - Dichter Don Alfonso
 The Old Fritz (1928, part 2) - Graf Cobenzl
 Beating Heart (1928) - 3. Ehemann
 Under the Lantern (1928) - Gustave Nevin
 The First Kiss (1928) - James Twist
 The Secret Courier (1928) - Duc d'Orléans
 The Burning Heart (1929)
 Diane (1929) - Tichon, Kammerdiener
 The Model from Montparnasse (1929) - Sleeper conductor
 Triumph of Love (1929) - Flemming
 Jenny's Stroll Through Men (1929) - Lorenz, Modezeichner
 Three Around Edith (1929) - Scherbe
 Ludwig II, King of Bavaria (1930)
 Love's Carnival (1930) - Benno von Klewitz - Leutnant
 The Flute Concert of Sanssouci (1930) - Attaché
 The Sacred Flame (1931) - (uncredited)
 The Theft of the Mona Lisa (1931) - Museumsführer
 My Wife, the Impostor (1931)
 Der Schlemihl (1931) - Baron Stechling
 The Company's in Love (1932) - Fritz Willner - Filmautor
 For Once I'd Like to Have No Troubles (1932) - Görner - Friseurgehilfe
 Der schwarze Husar (1932)
 The White Demon (1932) - Marquis d'Esquillon
 Contest (1932) - Schneckendorf
 When Love Sets the Fashion (1932) - Mr. Farell
 The Empress and I (1933) - Flügeladjutant
 Manolescu, Prince of Thieves (1933) - Der Kellner im Hotel Ritz
 Die Nacht der großen Liebe (1933) - Konsulatssekretär
 Ein gewisser Herr Gran (1933) - Hauptmann Gordon
  (1933) - 3. Gast Lissys
 Dream of the Rhine (1933) - Conny
 Ihre Durchlaucht, die Verkäuferin (1933) - Paul
 Des jungen Dessauers große Liebe (1933) - Graf von Syringen
 The Only Girl (1933)
 Tambour battant (1933)
 The Fugitive from Chicago (1934) - Werner Dux
 The World Without a Mask (1934) - E.W. Costa
 Frühlingsmärchen (1934) - Karlchen Wolf, Librettist aus Finsterwalde
 The Big Chance (1934) - Georg, ihr Sohn
 The Island (1934) - Graf Squeelen, erster Botschaftsrat
 A Woman Who Knows What She Wants (1934) - Lynge, Bankier
  (1934) - Prof. Mertens
 She and the Three (1935) - André Nicol
 Die Katz' im Sack (1935) - Louis Grevenelle
 Winter Night's Dream (1935) - Degenfels
 Everything for a Woman (1935) - Maxwell, ein dunkler Ehrenmann
 Ein falscher Fuffziger (1935) - Wallner, Betrüger
 Barcarolle (1935) - Lopuchin
 Ein Mädel aus guter Familie (1935) - Direktor Hollmann
 Last Stop (1935) - Marcel Steiner, Direktor des Salon 'Flora'
 Ein ganzer Kerl (1935) - Baron von Petersen
 The King's Prisoner (1935) - Von Beichlingen
 If It Were Not for Music (1935) - Kusjmitsch von Prschitschkin
 April, April! (1935) - Müller, Reisender
 Königstiger (1935) - Vicomte d'Aubert
 Hangmen, Women and Soldiers (1935) - Rittmeister Lensberg
 Es flüstert die Liebe (1935) - Lenoir
 Paul and Pauline (1936) - Apotheker Knullingen
 Stjenka Rasin (1936) - Borodin
 Family Parade (1936) - Vetter Max
 Orders Are Orders (1936) - Rittmeister von Schlackberg
 Fräulein Veronika (1936) - Theo
 Thou Art My Joy (1936) - Dr.Hofreuter - Lawyer
 Game on Board (1936) - Marquis de la Tour
 The Voice of the Heart (1937) - Kammerdiener der Prinzessin
 The Happiest Married Couple in Vienna (1937) - Oskar Brenner
 Don't Promise Me Anything (1937) - Dr. Elk
 Strife Over the Boy Jo (1937) - Monsieur Merminod
 The Irresistible Man (1937) - Marquis de Rossignol
 Ein Volksfeind (1937) - Redakteur Fink
 Fanny Elssler (1937) - Polizeipräfekt
 After Midnight (1938) - Ricin
 Frühlingsluft (1938) - Graf Rasumirksi
 Anna Favetti (1938) - Hotelgast
 The Deruga Case (1938) - Riedmüller
 So You Don't Know Korff Yet? (1938) - Reporter Droste (uncredited)
 The Night of Decision (1938) - Chef des Modesalons
 Women for Golden Hill (1938) - Tanzmanager
 Bel Ami (1939) - Redakteur Varenne
 The Leghorn Hat (1939) - Rosalba
 Salonwagen E 417 (1939) - Kuhlemanns Komplize
 Hello Janine! (1939) - Jean
 Wibbel the Tailor (1939) - Knillich
 Kitty and the World Conference (1939) - Carter
 Robert Koch (1939) - Fähnrich Graf
 A Woman Like You (1939) - Verkäufer im Sportgeschäft
 Maria Ilona (1939) - Pizzi, der Scherenschnittkünstler
 We Danced Around the World (1939) - 2. Theaterdirektor in Stockholm
 Der Weg zu Isabel (1940) - Bü-Bü
 Passion (1940) - Graf Christian
  (1940) - Auktionator
 Angelika (1940) - Kabarett-Direktor
 The Star of Rio (1940) - Monsieur Louis Borinage
 Golowin geht durch die Stadt (1940)
 Die Rothschilds (1940) - Baron Vitrolles
 Trenck, der Pandur (1940) - Herr von Sazenthal
 Das Herz der Königin (1940) - Sir John - d*er englische Gesandte
 Kora Terry (1940)
  (1940) - Ballettmeister Petit
 Venus on Trial (1941) - Dr.Knarre, Sachverständiger
  (1941) - Rat Haschke
 Was geschah in dieser Nacht (1941) - Werner Gebhardt
 Two in a Big City (1942)
 Weiße Wäsche (1942)
 Der große Schatten (1942) - Voß, Schauspieler
 Diesel (1942) - Herr von Lorrenz (uncredited)
 Ein Zug fährt ab (1942) - Frisör Schön
 Münchhausen (1943) - Prinz Anton Ulrich
 Leichtes Blut (1943) - Möllendorf
 Ich habe von dir geträumt (1944) - Empfangschef
 Der Mann, dem man den Namen stahl (1944) - Max Vieregg
 Shiva und die Galgenblume (1945)
 Das Mädchen Juanita (1945) - Verwandter des Konsul Henselings
 Tell the Truth (1946)
 In the Temple of Venus (1948) - Raimondo
 The Adventures of Fridolin (1948) - Der falsche Biedermann
 The Court Concert (1948)
 Blocked Signals (1948) - Der Baron
 The Great Mandarin (1949) - Chinesischer Staatsbeamter
 Love '47 (1949) - Direktor Engelbrecht
 Amico (1949) - Schwarz, Oberkellner
 Nothing But Coincidence (1949) - Schönheitssaloninhaber
 Artists' Blood (1949) - Ricardo Pisetti - Manager
 Kätchen für alles (1949) - Ein Herr
 The Murder Trial of Doctor Jordan (1949) - Wedekind
 The Blue Straw Hat (1949) - Ciapollini
 Der große Fall (1949) - Ein dunkler Ehrenmann
 Unknown Sender (1950) - Schmoll, Lehrer
 Who Is This That I Love? (1950) - Zauberer
 Kein Engel ist so rein (1950) - Mohrbutter
 My Niece Susanne (1950) - Oscar, Friseur
 Maharadscha wider Willen (1950) - Knirps - Generalsekretärs des Wunderfriseurs
 Love on Ice (1950) - Hoteldirektor Schabratzky
 The Man in Search of Himself (1950) - Direktor Cattoni
 Trouble in Paradise (1950)
 The Disturbed Wedding Night (1950) - Frank Betterton, Lawyer
 The Girl from the South Seas (1950)
 Die Sterne lügen nicht (1950) - Baron v. Malachowsky alias Emil Branske
 A Rare Lover (1950) - Poule, Verlege
 The Midnight Venus (1951) - Director Meyer
  (1951) - Neumann
 Engel im Abendkleid (1951)
 Hilfe, ich bin unsichtbar (1951) - Professor Orsini
 Das späte Mädchen (1951) - Buchhändler
 The Dubarry (1951) - Stranitzky, Schmierendirektor
 The Colourful Dream (1952) - Brandini
 The Thief of Bagdad (1952) - Hussa Hussa
 Klettermaxe (1952) - Dobnika
 That Can Happen to Anyone (1952) - Walputzke
 Weekend in Paradise (1952) - Empfangschef
 I'm Waiting for You (1952) - Studienrat Schwarze
 Traumschöne Nacht (1952) - Maroni, Theaterdirektor
 We'll Talk About Love Later (1953) - Herr Wilmar, Inhaber Kosmetik-Salon
 Heute nacht passiert's (1953) - Textilkaufmann Schulz
 Knall and Fall as Detectives (1953) - Stapler
 They Call It Love (1953) - Balancourt
 Not Afraid of Big Animals (1953) - Kunstreiter
 Fanfare of Marriage (1953) - Hornisse
 The Bogeyman (1953) - Hoteldirektor
 Columbus Discovers Kraehwinkel (1954)
 Maxie (1954) - Felix, Diener
 Keine Angst vor Schwiegermüttern (1954)
 Ten on Every Finger (1954) - Director des Lido
 Hochstaplerin der Liebe (1954) - Meister Philippe
 The Missing Miniature (1954) - Tänzer
 The Blue Danube (1955) - Baron Philipp
 Music, Music and Only Music (1955) - Bieberich
 The Spanish Fly (1955)
 Ball at the Savoy (1955) - Max
 Love, Dance and a Thousand Songs (1955) - Director Winkler
 The Forest House in Tyrol (1955) - von Langer, Staatsanwalt
 Die Wirtin zur Goldenen Krone (1955) - Weckenberg
 IA in Oberbayern (1956) - Diener Fritz
 Die wilde Auguste (1956) - Baron von Freitag
 Dany, bitte schreiben Sie (1956) - Geschäftsführer Schnattke
 The Stolen Trousers (1956) - Signore Ricoli
 Hilfe - sie liebt mich (1956) - Direktor der "Elysée-Bar
 Küß mich noch einmal (1956) - Direktor Landinger
 The Captain from Köpenick (1956) - (uncredited)
 Santa Lucia (1956) - Tutu
 Zu Befehl, Frau Feldwebel (1956) - Kriegsgerichtsrat Kronberg
 Manöverball (1956) - Hauptmann Brothusen
 Sommerliebe am Bodensee (1957) - Oberkelalner
 Tolle Nacht (1957) - Herr Lemke, Schauspieler
 Tired Theodore (1957) - Wilhelm Schulze
 Two Bavarians in the Jungle (1957) - Jawassis
 Das Glück liegt auf der Straße (1957) - Generaldirektor Kartzer
 Siebenmal in der Woche (1957) - Füllkrug
 The Mad Bomberg (1957) - Pfarrer
 Weißer Holunder (1957) - Taddäus von Zylinski
 Träume von der Südsee (1957) - Kapitän
 Vacanze a Ischia (1957) - Colonnello Manfredi
 Heute blau und morgen blau (1957) - Sanitätsrat Schlucker 
 Europas neue Musikparade 1958 (1957) - Wuttke
 Ferien auf Immenhof (1957) - Dr. Westkamp
 The Spessart Inn (1958) - Polizeimajor
  (1958) - Alfons Spadolini
 Rosemary (1958) - Kleye
 The Csardas King (1958) - Szegedy
 The Star of Santa Clara (1958) - Freddy
 Piefke, der Schrecken der Kompanie (1958) - Fürst Paul XIII. von Krakelsburg-Kummerstein
 Love, Girls and Soldiers (1958) - Major von Siebenstern
 Die Seeteufel von Angostura (1958)
 Skandal um Dodo (1959) - Graf Udo von Pleitenstein
 La Paloma (1959) - Direktor Bauer
 Bobby Dodd greift ein (1959)
 Melodie und Rhythmus (1959) - Orlando / Himself
 Der lustige Krieg des Hauptmann Pedro (1959) - Moritz von Persipan, Kriegsminister
 The Man Who Walked Through the Wall (1959) - Pickler - der Bürochef
 Salem Aleikum (1959) - Polizeichef Pierre Duval
 The Man in the Black Derby (1960) - Chef der russischen Atomdelegation
 The Haunted Castle (1960) - Oberregierungsrat von Teckel / Obrist von Teckel
  (1960) - Herzog
 Schlußakkord (1960)
 Mein Mann, das Wirtschaftswunder (1961)
 Festival (1961)
 The Adventures of Count Bobby (1961) - Mr. Cower
 The Secret Ways (1961) - Hermann Sheffler
 Junge Leute brauchen Liebe (1961) - Monsieur Terrier
 Ein Stern fällt vom Himmel (1961) - Adv. Diffenthal
  (1961) - Schulrat
 Robert and Bretram (1961) - Kriminalkommissar Wolf
 One, Two, Three (1961) - Count von Droste Schattenburg
 Freddy and the Millionaire (1961) - Direktor Walloschek
 The Turkish Cucumbers (1962) - Rubin y Soliman
 Der verkaufte Großvater (1962) - Friedrich Wilhelm Dünkelberg
 Das ist die Liebe der Matrosen (1962) - Freiherr von Mumpitz
 So toll wie anno dazumal (1962) - Mandler
 Wenn die Musik spielt am Wörthersee (1962) - Axel Bender, Evelyns Vater 
 Wedding Night in Paradise (1962) - Gustav Säuerling, Bonbonfabrikant
 Das schwarz-weiß-rote Himmelbett (1962) - Oberst Pusslitz
 ...und ewig knallen die Räuber (1962) - Herr von Merlyn
 Das Kriminalmuseum (1963, TV Series) - Rittmeister a.D. von Rellstab
 Allotria in Zell am See (1963) - Hauptmann Hans Hajo von Gestern
 ...denn die Musik und die Liebe in Tirol (1963) - Oskar Ortshaus
 The Girl from the Islands (1964) - Direktor Dingelmeyer
 DM-Killer (1965) - Chief Prosecutor
 Neues vom Hexer (1965) - Judge Matthews
 Ich kauf' mir lieber einen Tirolerhut (1965) - Hubert Krempe
 The Sinful Village (1966) - Anwalt
 The Hunchback of Soho (1966) - General Edward Perkins
 Brille und Bombe - Bei uns liegen Sie richtig! (1967) - Der Hoteldirektor
 Glorious Times at the Spessart Inn (1967) - General Teckel
 When Ludwig Goes on Manoeuvres (1967) - von Below
 Im Banne des Unheimlichen (1968) - Sir Arthur
 Otto ist auf Frauen scharf (1968) - Dr. Zwyfalt
 The Gorilla of Soho (1968) - Sir Arthur
 Donnerwetter! Donnerwetter! Bonifatius Kiesewetter (1969) - Felix, Dekanatsfaktotum
 The Man with the Glass Eye (1969) - Sir Arthur
 Ein dreifach Hoch dem Sanitätsgefreiten Neumann (1969) - Oberstabsarzt Dr. Treppwitz
 Charley's Uncle (1969) - Most
 Dr. Fabian: Laughing Is the Best Medicine (1969) - General von Kottwitz
 When the Mad Aunts Arrive (1970) - Herr Storz
 Keine Angst Liebling, ich pass schon auf (1970) - Portier vom Hotel Central
  (1970) - Notar

References

External links

1896 births
1971 deaths
20th-century German male actors
German male film actors
German male silent film actors